Juan Agustín Musso (born 6 May 1994) is an Argentine professional footballer who plays as a goalkeeper for  club Atalanta and the Argentina national team.

Club career
Musso trained at the academy of Club de Regatas San Nicolas, before going on loan to Defensores de Belgrano de Villa Ramallo, with which he won the local championship at the age of 16. In the final, he saved three out of five penalties in the shoot-out.

Racing Club
Musso was the third-choice goalkeeper during Racing Club's 2014 Argentine Primera División championship, the team's first title in 13 years. He made his professional debut three years later, on 28 May 2017, in a 2–1 home win against San Lorenzo. He became the team's first-choice keeper during the 2017–18 Argentine Primera División, in which Racing finished in 7th place and qualified for the 2019 Copa Sudamericana.

Udinese
In the summer of 2018, he was signed by Serie A side Udinese. Throughout the season, Musso established himself as the undisputed starter and became one of the team's key players. In three seasons, he accumulated a total of 102 appearances in the league.

Atalanta
On 2 July 2021, Musso was signed by Atalanta.

International career
Musso was born in Argentina and is of Italian descent, and holds both passports. He was part of the Argentina U20 national team's squad for the friendly tournament Four Nations match at La Serena, Chile in preparation for the 2013 South American Youth Football Championship.

He made his debut for the senior national team on 26 March 2019 in a friendly against Morocco, as a 67th-minute substitute for Esteban Andrada. On 14 June 2019, he received a late call-up for the 2019 Copa América to replace the injured Andrada.

Career statistics

Club

International

Honours
Racing Club
 Argentine Primera División: 2014 Transición
Argentina
Copa América: 2021
 Superclásico de las Américas: 2019

References

External links
Profile at the Atalanta B.C. website

1994 births
Living people
People from San Nicolás de los Arroyos
Sportspeople from Buenos Aires Province
Argentine people of Italian descent
Argentine footballers
Association football goalkeepers
Argentine Primera División players
Racing Club de Avellaneda footballers
Serie A players
Atalanta B.C. players
Udinese Calcio players
Argentine expatriate footballers
Argentina international footballers
2019 Copa América players
2021 Copa América players
Copa América-winning players